Kipini is a historic Swahili settlement in Kenya's Coast Province.

See also
Historic Swahili settlements
Swahili architecture

References 

Swahili people
Swahili city-states
Swahili culture
Populated places in Coast Province